Soledad Nacional Salvador (8 March 1957 – 24 August 1985) was a religious worker and activist in the Philippines who fought against the dictatorship of Ferdinand Marcos.

Salvador fought for indigenous people's rights to their land.

Her name is inscribed on the Bantayog ng mga Bayani Wall of Remembrance, a memorial that honours martyrs and heroes who fought the dictatorship.

See also 
 Bantayog ng mga Bayani
 Religious sector resistance to Ferdinand Marcos's dictatorship

References 

Individuals honored at the Bantayog ng mga Bayani
Marcos martial law victims
Political repression in the Philippines
1957 births
1985 deaths
Place of birth missing
Place of death missing